Sharon Springs may refer to a place in the United States:

 Sharon Springs, Kansas
 Sharon Springs, New York
 Sharon Springs, Georgia